Tom Scott (born November 19, 1951) is a former Canadian Football League receiver for the Winnipeg Blue Bombers, Edmonton Eskimos and Calgary Stampeders. He was drafted in the 1973 NFL Draft by the Detroit Lions. In an 11-year professional career from 1974–1984, he caught 649 passes for 10,837 yards and 88 touchdowns. Scott was a part of five Grey Cup winning teams with the Eskimos. He is a member of  the Canadian Football Hall of Fame, where he was inducted in 1998.

Born and raised in northern California, Scott played college football at the University of Washington in Seattle, alongside quarterback Sonny Sixkiller.

References

External links
Just Sports Stats

1951 births
Living people
American players of Canadian football
Calgary Stampeders players
Canadian Football Hall of Fame inductees
Canadian Football League Rookie of the Year Award winners
Canadian football slotbacks
Edmonton Elks players
Players of Canadian football from Oakland, California
Washington Huskies football players
Winnipeg Blue Bombers players

Junípero Serra High School (San Mateo, California) alumni